is a town in Tokachi Subprefecture, Hokkaido, Japan.

, the town has an estimated population of 3,262 and a density of 6.1 persons per km².

The town is separated into two main areas, Toyokoro and Moiwa. These areas are separated by the Tokachi River. Two bridges, Toyokoro Ohashi Bridge and Moiwa Bridge, connect the two. The Toyokoro area has the town's railway station (which is unstaffed), an elementary school, the town's only junior high school, a gas station and the town's only major convenience store (Seicomart) and a few residential streets. The Moiwa area is the major area of the town, which has the Town Hall, the town convention center, the bank, two small supermarkets, a post office, an elementary school and the majority of the residential area. It is also where Moiwa Mountain is, which has a park golf course, camping facilities, and even a very small airport.

The town is famous for the Harunire Tree, which is two elm trees that are fused together to look like one. The tree has a very pleasing shape and was used in a car commercial.

Mascots

They are based on the Harunire Tree. As they are tree fairies, they can live over 140 years (according to legend) and can talk to the wind. Their goal is to teach the importance of cooperative friendship. Their weakness is loneliness. Eru-kun likes salmon rice balls, waffles and hot milk while Dream-chan likes potato dumplings, soft serve ice cream and an-doughnuts.

International relations

Twin towns and Sister cities
Toyokoro is twinned with:
  Sōma, Fukushima, Japan
  Namerikawa, Toyama, Japan 
  Summerland, British Columbia, Canada

References

External links

Official Website 

Towns in Hokkaido